INFOCOM may refer to:

Infocom, a software company
IEEE Conference on Computer Communications, a computer science conference